Jerzy Kosiński (born Józef Lewinkopf; ; June 14, 1933 – May 3, 1991) was a Polish-American novelist and two-time president of the American Chapter of P.E.N., who wrote primarily in English. Born in Poland, he survived World War II and, as a young man, emigrated to the U.S., where he became a citizen.

He was known for various novels, among them Being There (1970) and The Painted Bird (1965), which were adapted as films in 1979 and 2019 respectively.

Biography  
Kosiński was born Józef Lewinkopf to Jewish parents in Łódź, Poland.  As a child during World War II, he lived in central Poland under a false identity, Jerzy Kosiński, which his father gave to him. Eugeniusz Okoń, a Catholic priest, issued him a forged baptismal certificate, and the Lewinkopf family survived the Holocaust thanks to local villagers who offered assistance to Polish Jews, often at great risk. Kosiński's father was assisted not only by town leaders and clergymen, but also by individuals such as Marianna Pasiowa, a member of an underground network that helped Jews evade capture. The family lived openly in Dąbrowa Rzeczycka, near Stalowa Wola, and attended church in nearby Wola Rzeczycka, with the support of villagers in Kępa Rzeczycka. For a time, they were sheltered by a Catholic family in Rzeczyca Okrągła. Jerzy even served as an altar boy in the local church.

After the war ended, Kosiński and his parents moved to Jelenia Góra. By age 22, he had earned graduate degrees in history and sociology at the University of Łódź. He then became a teaching assistant at the Polish Academy of Sciences. Kosiński also studied in the Soviet Union, and served as a sharpshooter in the Polish Army.

To migrate to the United States in 1957, he created a fake foundation, which supposedly sponsored him. He later claimed he forged the letters from prominent communist authorities guaranteeing his loyal return to Poland, as were then required for anyone leaving the country.

Kosiński first worked at odd jobs to get by, including driving a truck, and he managed to graduate from Columbia University. He became an American citizen in 1965. He also received grants from the Guggenheim Fellowship in 1967 and the Ford Foundation in 1968. In 1970, he won the American Academy of Arts and Letters award for literature. The grants allowed him to write a political non-fiction book that opened new doors of opportunity. He became a lecturer at Yale, Princeton, Davenport, and Wesleyan universities.

Kosiński practiced the photographic arts, with one-man exhibitions to his credit in Warsaw's Crooked Circle Gallery (1957) and in the Andre Zarre Gallery in New York (1988).

In 1962, Kosiński married an American steel heiress Mary Hayward Weir. They divorced four years later. Weir died in 1968 from brain cancer, leaving Kosiński out of her will. He fictionalized his marriage in his novel Blind Date, speaking of Weir under the pseudonym Mary-Jane Kirkland. Kosiński later, in 1968, married Katherina "Kiki" von Fraunhofer (1933–2007), a marketing consultant and a descendant of Bavarian nobility.

Death 
Toward the end of his life, Kosiński suffered from multiple illnesses and was under attack from journalists who accused him of plagiarism. By his late 50s, he was suffering from an irregular heartbeat.

He committed suicide on May 3, 1991 by ingesting a lethal amount of alcohol and drugs and wrapping a plastic bag around his head, suffocating himself to death. His suicide note read: "I am going to put myself to sleep now for a bit longer than usual. Call it Eternity." Kosinski's remains were cremated and his ashes were scattered off a small cove in Casa de Campo in the Dominican Republic.

Notable novels 
Kosiński's novels have appeared on The New York Times Best Seller list, and have been translated into over 30 languages, with total sales estimated at 70 million in 1991.

The Painted Bird 
The Painted Bird, Kosiński's controversial 1965 novel, is a fictional account that depicts the personal experiences of a boy of unknown religious and ethnic background who wanders around unidentified areas of Eastern Europe during World War II and takes refuge among a series of people, many of whom are brutally cruel and abusive, either to him or to others.

Soon after the book was published in the US, Kosiński was accused by the then-Communist Polish government of being anti-Polish, especially following the regime's 1968 anti-Semitic campaign. The book was banned in Poland from its initial publication until the fall of the Communist government in 1989. When it was finally printed, thousands of Poles in Warsaw lined up for as long as eight hours to purchase copies of the work autographed by Kosiński. Polish literary critic and University of Warsaw professor Paweł Dudziak remarked that "in spite of the unclear role of its author,The Painted Bird is an achievement in English literature." He stressed that, because the book is a work of fiction and does not document real-world events, accusations of anti-Polish sentiment may result only from taking it too literally.

The book received recommendations from Elie Wiesel who wrote in The New York Times Book Review that it was "one of the best ... Written with deep sincerity and sensitivity." Richard Kluger, reviewing it for Harper's Magazine wrote:  "Extraordinary ... literally staggering ... one of the most powerful books I have ever read." Jonathan Yardley, reviewing it for The Miami Herald, wrote: "Of all the remarkable fiction that emerged from World War II, nothing stands higher than Jerzy Kosiński's The Painted Bird. A magnificent work of art, and a celebration of the individual will. No one who reads it will forget it; no one who reads it will be unmoved by it."

However, reception of the book was not uniformly positive. Several claims that Kosiński committed plagiarism in writing The Painted Bird were leveled against him. (See 'Criticism' section, below.)

Steps 
Steps (1968), a novel comprising scores of loosely connected vignettes, won the U.S. National Book Award for Fiction.

American novelist David Foster Wallace described Steps as a "collection of unbelievably creepy little allegorical tableaux done in a terse elegant voice that's like nothing else anywhere ever". Wallace continued in praise: "Only Kafka's fragments get anywhere close to where Kosiński goes in this book, which is better than everything else he ever did combined." Samuel Coale, in a 1974 discussion of Kosiński's fiction, wrote that "the narrator of  Steps for instance, seems to be nothing more than a disembodied voice howling in some surrealistic wilderness."

Being There 

One of Kosiński's more significant works is Being There (1970), a satirical view of the absurd reality of America's media culture. It is the story of Chance the gardener, a man with few distinctive qualities who emerges from nowhere and suddenly becomes the heir to the throne of a Wall Street tycoon and a presidential policy adviser. His simple and straightforward responses to popular concerns are praised as visionary despite the fact that no one actually understands what he is really saying. Many questions surround his mysterious origins, and filling in the blanks in his background proves impossible.

The novel was made into a 1979 movie directed by Hal Ashby, and starring Peter Sellers, who was nominated for an Academy Award for the role, and Melvyn Douglas, who won the award for Best Supporting Actor. The screenplay was co-written by award-winning screenwriter Robert C. Jones and Kosiński. The film won the 1981 British Academy of Film and Television Arts (Film) Best Screenplay Award, as well as the 1980 Writers Guild of America Award (Screen) for Best Comedy Adapted from Another Medium. It was nominated for the 1980 Golden Globe Best Screenplay Award (Motion Picture).

Criticism 
According to Eliot Weinberger, an American writer, essayist, editor and translator, Kosiński was not the author of The Painted Bird. Weinberger alleged in his 2000 book Karmic Traces that Kosiński was not fluent in English at the time of its writing.

In a review of Jerzy Kosiński: A Biography by James Park Sloan, D.G. Myers, associate professor of English at Texas A&M University wrote "For years Kosinski passed off The Painted Bird as the true story of his own experience during the Holocaust. Long before writing it he regaled friends and dinner parties with macabre tales of a childhood spent in hiding among the Polish peasantry. Among those who were fascinated was Dorothy de Santillana, a senior editor at Houghton Mifflin, to whom Kosiński confided that he had a manuscript based on his experiences. Upon accepting the book for publication, Santillana said 'It is my understanding that, fictional as the material may sound, it is straight autobiography'. Although he backed away from this claim, Kosiński never wholly disavowed it."

M.A. Orthofer addressed Weinberger's assertion: "Kosinski was, in many respects, a fake – possibly near as genuine a one as Weinberger could want.  (One aspect of the best fakes is the lingering doubt that, possibly, there is some authenticity behind them – as is the case with Kosinski.)  Kosinski famously liked to pretend he was someone he wasn't (as do many of the characters in his books), he occasionally published under a pseudonym, and, apparently, he plagiarized and forged left and right."

Kosiński addressed these claims in the introduction to the 1976 reissue of The Painted Bird, saying that "Well-intentioned writers, critics, and readers sought facts to back up their claims that the novel was autobiographical. They wanted to cast me in the role of spokesman for my generation, especially for those who had survived the war; but for me, survival was an individual action that earned the survivor the right to speak only for himself. Facts about my life and my origins, I felt, should not be used to test the book's authenticity, any more than they should be used to encourage readers to read The Painted Bird. Furthermore, I felt then, as I do now, that fiction and autobiography are very different modes."

Plagiarism allegations 
In June 1982, a Village Voice report by Geoffrey Stokes and Eliot Fremont-Smith accused Kosiński of plagiarism, claiming that much of his work was derivative of prewar books unfamiliar to English-speaking readers, and that Being There was a plagiarism of Kariera Nikodema Dyzmy — The Career of Nicodemus Dyzma — a 1932 Polish bestseller by Tadeusz Dołęga-Mostowicz. They also alleged Kosiński wrote The Painted Bird in Polish, and had it secretly translated into English. The report claimed that Kosiński's books had been ghost-written by "assistant editors", finding stylistic differences among Kosiński's novels. Kosiński, according to them, had depended upon his freelance editors for "the sort of composition that we usually call writing." American biographer James Sloan notes that New York poet, publisher and translator George Reavey claimed to have written The Painted Bird for Kosiński.

The article found a more realistic picture of Kosiński's life during the Holocaust – a view which was supported by biographers Joanna Siedlecka and Sloan. The article asserted that The Painted Bird, assumed to be semi-autobiographical, was largely a work of fiction. The information showed that rather than wandering the Polish countryside, as his fictional character did, Kosiński spent the war years in hiding with Polish Catholics.

Terence Blacker, a profitable English publisher (who helped publish Kosiński's books) and author of children's books and mysteries for adults, wrote an article published in The Independent in 2002:

The significant point about Jerzy Kosiński was that...his books...had a vision and a voice consistent with one another and with the man himself. The problem was perhaps that he was a successful, worldly author who played polo, moved in fashionable circles and even appeared as an actor in Warren Beatty's Reds. He seemed to have had an adventurous and rather kinky sexuality which, to many, made him all the more suspect. All in all, he was a perfect candidate for the snarling pack of literary hangers-on to turn on. There is something about a storyteller becoming rich and having a reasonably full private life that has a powerful potential to irritate so that, when things go wrong, it causes a very special kind of joy.

Journalist John Corry wrote a 6,000-word feature article in The New York Times in November 1982, responding and defending Kosiński, which appeared on the front page of the Arts and Leisure section. Among other things, Corry alleged that reports claiming that "Kosinski was a plagiarist in the pay of the C.I.A. were the product of a Polish Communist disinformation campaign."

In 1988, he wrote The Hermit of 69th Street, in which he sought to demonstrate the absurdity of investigating prior work by inserting footnotes for practically every term in the book. "Ironically," wrote theatre critic Lucy Komisar, "possibly his only true book ... about a successful author who is shown to be a fraud."

Despite repudiation of the Village Voice allegations in detailed articles in The New York Times, The Los Angeles Times, and other publications, Kosiński remained tainted. "I think it contributed to his death," said Zbigniew Brzezinski, a friend and fellow Polish emigrant.

Television, radio, film, and newspaper appearances
Kosiński appeared 12 times on The Tonight Show Starring Johnny Carson during 1971–1973, and The Dick Cavett Show in 1974, was a guest on the talk radio show of Long John Nebel, posed half-naked for a cover photograph by Annie Leibovitz for The New York Times Magazine in 1982, and presented the Oscar for screenwriting in 1982.

He also played the role of Bolshevik revolutionary and Politburo member Grigory Zinoviev in Warren Beatty's film Reds.  The Time magazine critic wrote:  "As Reed's Soviet nemesis, novelist Jerzy Kosinski acquits himself nicely–a tundra of ice against Reed's all-American fire." Newsweek complimented Kosiński's "delightfully abrasive" performance.

Friendships 
Kosiński was friends with Roman Polanski, with whom he attended the National Film School in Łódź, and said he narrowly missed being at Polanski and Sharon Tate's house on the night Tate was murdered by Charles Manson's followers in 1969, due to lost luggage.  His novel Blind Date portrayed the Manson murders. In 1984, Polanski denied Kosiński's story in his autobiography. Journalist John Taylor of New York Magazine believes Polanski was mistaken. "Although it was a single sentence in a 461-page book, reviewers focused on it. But the accusation was untrue: Jerzy and Kiki had been invited to stay with Tate the night of the Manson murders, and they missed being killed as well only because they stopped in New York en route from Paris because their luggage had been misdirected." The reason why Taylor believes this is that "a friend of Kosiński wrote a letter to the Times, which was published in the Book Review, describing the detailed plans he and Jerzy had made to meet that weekend at Polanski's house on Cielo Drive." The letter referenced was written by Clement Biddle Wood.

Svetlana Alliluyeva, who had a friendship with Kosiński, is introduced as a character in his novel Blind Date.

Kosiński wrote his novel Pinball (1982) for his friend George Harrison, having conceived of the idea for the book at least 10 years before writing it.

Bibliography 
The Future Is Ours, Comrade: Conversations with the Russians (1960), published under the pseudonym "Joseph Novak"
No Third Path (1962), published under the pseudonym "Joseph Novak"
The Painted Bird (1965, revised 1976)
The Art of the Self: Essays à propos Steps (1968)
Steps (1968)
Being There (1970)
By Jerzy Kosinski: Packaged Passion. (1973)
The Devil Tree (1973, revised & expanded 1982)
Cockpit (1975)
Blind Date (1977)
Passion Play (1979)
Pinball (1982)
The Hermit of 69th Street (1988, revised 1991)
Passing By: Selected Essays, 1962–1991 (1992)
Oral Pleasure: Kosinski as Storyteller (2012)

Filmography
Being There (novel and screenplay, 1979)
Reds (actor, 1981) – Grigory Zinoviev
The Statue of Liberty (1985) – Himself
Łódź Ghetto (1989) – Mordechai Chaim Rumkowski (voice)
Religion, Inc. (actor, 1989) – Beggar (final film role)
Nabarvené ptáče (film) (2019, orig. The Painted Bird)

Awards and honors 
1966 – Prix du Meilleur Livre Étranger (essay category) for The Painted Bird
1969 – National Book Award for Steps.
1970 – Award in Literature, National Institute of Arts and Letters and American Academy of Arts and Letters
1973–75 – President of the American Chapter of P.E.N. Re-elected 1974, serving the maximum permitted two terms
1974 – B'rith Shalom Humanitarian Freedom Award
1977 – American Civil Liberties Union First Amendment Award
1979 – Writers Guild of America, East Best Screenplay Award for Being There (shared with screenwriter Robert C. Jones)
1980 – Polonia Media Perspectives Achievement Award
1981 – British Academy of Film and Television Arts (BAFTA) Best Screenplay of the Year Award for Being There
International House Harry Edmonds Life Achievement Award
Received PhD Honoris Causa in Hebrew Letters from Spertus College of Judaica
1988 – Received PhD Honoris Causa in Humane Letters from Albion College, Michigan
1989 – Received PhD Honoris Causa in Humane Letters from State University of New York at Potsdam

References

Further reading

Books 
 Eliot Weinberger Genuine Fakes in his collection Karmic Traces; New Directions, 2000, ; .
 Sepp L. Tiefenthaler, Jerzy Kosinski: Eine Einfuhrung in Sein Werk, 1980, 
 Norman Lavers, Jerzy Kosinski, 1982, 
 Byron L. Sherwin, Jerzy Kosinski: Literary Alarm Clock, 1982, 
 Barbara Ozieblo Rajkowska, Protagonista De Jerzy Kosinski: Personaje unico, 1986, 
 Paul R. Lilly, Jr., Words in Search of Victims: The Achievement of Jerzy Kosinski, Kent, Ohio, Kent State University Press, 1988, 
 Welch D. Everman, Jerzy Kosinski: the Literature of Violation, Borgo Press, 1991, .
 Tom Teicholz, ed. Conversations with Jerzy Kosinski, Jackson: University Press of Mississippi, 1993, 
 Joanna Siedlecka, Czarny ptasior (The Black Bird), CIS, 1994, 
 Joanna Siedlecka, The Ugly Black Bird, Leopolis Press, 2018 
 James Park Sloan, Jerzy Kosinski: a Biography, Diane Pub. Co., 1996, .
 Agnieszka Salska, Marek Jedlinski, Jerzy Kosinski : Man and Work at the Crossroads of Cultures, 1997, 
 Barbara Tepa Lupack, ed. Critical Essays on Jerzy Kosinski, New York: G.K. Hall, 1998, 
 Barbara Tepa Lupack, Being There in the Age of Trump, Lexington Books, 2020,

Articles 
Oleg Ivsky, Review of The Painted Bird in Library Journal, Vol. 90, October 1, 1965, p. 4109
Irving Howe, Review of The Painted Bird in Harper's Magazine, October 1965
Andrew Feld, Review in Book Week, October 17, 1965, p. 2
Anne Halley, Review of The Painted Bird in Nation, Vol. 201, November 29, 1965, p. 424
D.A.N. Jones, Review of Steps in The New York Review of Books, Volume 12, Number 4, February 27, 1969
Irving Howe, Review of Being There in Harper's Magazine, July 1971, p. 89.
David H. Richter, The Three Denouements of Jerzy Kosinski's "The Painted Bird", Contemporary Literature, Vol. 15, No. 3, Summer 1974, pp. 370–85
Gail Sheehy, "The Psychological Novelist as Portable Man", Psychology Today, December 11, 1977, pp. 126–30
Margaret Kupcinskas Keshawarz, "Simas Kidirka:  A Literary Symbol of Democratic Individualism in Jerzy Kosinski's Cockpit", Lituanus (Lithuanian Quarterly Journal of Arts and Sciences), Vol. 25, No.4, Winter 1979
Roger Copeland, "An Interview with Jerzy Kosinski", New York Art Journal, Vol. 21, pp. 10–12, 1980
Robert E. Ziegler, "Identity and Anonymity in the Novels of Jerzy Kosinski", Rocky Mountain Review of Language and Literature, Vol. 35, No. 2, 1981, pp. 99–109
Barbara Gelb, "Being Jerzy Kosinski", New York Times Magazine, February 21, 1982, pp. 42–46
Stephen Schiff, "The Kosinski Conundrum", Vanity Fair, June 1988, pp 114–19
Thomas S. Gladsky, "Jerzy Kosinski's East European Self", Critique: Studies in Contemporary Fiction, Vol. XXIX, No. 2, Winter 1988, pp. 121–32
Michael Schumacher, "Jerzy Kosinski", Writer's Yearbook, 1990, Vol. 60, pp. 82–87.
John Corry, "The Most Considerate of Men", American Spectator, Vol. 24, No. 7, July 1991, pp. 17–18
Phillip Routh, "The Rise and Fall of Jerzy Kosinski", Arts &  Opinion, Vol. 6, No. 6, 2007.
Timothy Neale, "'... the credentials that would rescue me': Trauma and the Fraudulent Survivor", Holocaust & Genocide Studies, Vol. 24, No. 3, 2010.

Biographical accounts 
He is the subject of the off-Broadway play More Lies About Jerzy (2001), written by Davey Holmes and originally starring Jared Harris as Kosinski-inspired character "Jerzy Lesnewski". The most recent production being produced at the New End Theatre in London starring George Layton.

He also appears as one of the 'literary golems' (ghosts) in Thane Rosenbaum's novel The Golems of Gotham.

One of the songs of the Polish band NeLL, entitled "Frisco Lights", was inspired by Kosinski.

External links 
 
 Katherina von Fraunhofer-Kosinski Collection of Jerzy Kosinski. General Collection, Beinecke Rare Book and Manuscript Library, Yale University.
  Designing for Jerzy Kosinski
 Jerzy Kosiński at Culture.pl

1933 births
1991 suicides
Writers from Łódź
People from Łódź Voivodeship (1919–1939)
20th-century Polish Jews
Polish emigrants to the United States
20th-century American novelists
20th-century Polish novelists
American male novelists
Exophonic writers
Jewish American novelists
People involved in plagiarism controversies
Polish male novelists
Postmodern writers
Writers from New York City
Novelists from Connecticut
Novelists from New York (state)
University of Łódź alumni
Columbia University alumni
Wesleyan University faculty
National Book Award winners
Writers Guild of America Award winners
Drug-related suicides in New York City
Best Screenplay BAFTA Award winners
Suicides in New York City
Drug-related deaths in New York City
20th-century American male writers
20th-century screenwriters
20th-century American Jews